The naturalized athletes of China are those naturalized citizens who are part, or have been part, of the People's Republic of China national teams in the Olympic sports.

The rules

Article 3
"The People's Republic of China does not recognize dual nationality for any Chinese national."
Article 4
"Any person born in China whose parents are both Chinese nationals or one of whose parents is a Chinese national shall have Chinese nationality."
Article 5
"Any person born abroad whose parents are both Chinese nationals or one of whose parents is a Chinese national shall have Chinese nationality. But a person whose parents are both Chinese nationals and have both settled abroad, or one of whose parents is a Chinese national and has settled abroad, and who has acquired foreign nationality at birth shall not have Chinese nationality."
Article 7
"Foreign nationals or stateless persons who are willing to abide by China's Constitution and laws and who meet one of the following conditions may be naturalized upon approval of their applications:
(1) "they are near relatives of Chinese nationals;
(2) "they have settled in China; or
(3) "they have other legitimate reasons."

The list

See also
 Chinese nationality law
 List of Chinese naturalized footballers

References

 
Naturalised sports competitors